Inishargy is a civil parish and townland (of 1,050 acres) in County Down, Northern Ireland. It is situated in the historic barony of Ards Upper.

Settlements
The civil parish contains the village of Kircubbin.

Townlands
Inishargy civil parish contains the following townlands:

Balliggan
Ballygarvan
Ballyobegan
Fish Quarter
Glastry
Gransha
Horse Island
Inishargy
Kircubbin
Nun's Quarter
Rowreagh
Sheelah's Island

See also
List of civil parishes of County Down

References

 
Townlands of County Down